The Verein für Socialpolitik, or the German Economic Association, is an important society of economists in the German-speaking area.

History 
The Verein was founded in Eisenach in 1872 as a response to the "social question". Among its founders were eminent economists like Gustav von Schmoller, Lujo Brentano and Adolph Wagner, who sought a middle path between socialist and laissez-faire economic policies. On the contrary, the liberal publicist Heinrich Bernhard Oppenheim, critical of their "fanciful positions", dubbed them the Kathedersozialisten (socialists of the chair), meant as pejorative term.

Among its later members were prominent sociologists like Max Weber and Werner Sombart. They took part in the famous Werturteilsstreit with the older generation of the Verein just before the First World War. The Verein was dissolved in 1936 under the Nazis, but was re-created in 1948 at a conference in Marburg.

Today, the Verein is headquartered in Berlin. It currently has around 3,800 individual members and 48 corporate members. It publishes a monograph series, the Schriften des Vereins für Sozialpolitik (Neu Folge), as well as two journals: the German Economic Review and Perspektiven der Wirtschaftspolitik. The verein annually awards the Gossen Prize to German-speaking economists under the age of 45. Another award given by the association is the Gustav Stolper Prize; it is named after economist Gustav Stolper, and is not subject to any age restrictions.

Important members 
 Lujo Brentano (1844–1931), German economist and social reformer, co-founder of the Verein 
 Karl Bücher (1847–1930), German economist
 Gustav Cohn (1840–1919), German economist
 Constantin von Dietze (1891–1973), agronomist, lawyer, economist, and theologian
 Ernst Engel (1821–1896), German statistician and economist
 Walter Eucken (1891–1950), German economist
 Carl Geibel (1842–1910), founding member, German book dealer and publisher 
 Martin Hellwig (born 1949), German economist
 Ignaz Jastrow (1856–1937), German economist and historian
 Georg Friedrich Knapp (1842–1926), German economist
 Roland Kirstein (born 1965), German economist and professor
 Emil Lederer (1882–1939),  Bohemian-German economist and sociologist
 Wilhelm Lexis (1837–1914), German statistician, economist, and social scientist
 Friedrich Naumann (1860–1919), German liberal politician and Protestant parish pastor
 Karl Rathgen (1856–1921), German Economist
 Alexander Rüstow (1885–1963), German sociologist and economist
 Gerhart von Schulze-Gaevernitz (1864–1943), German economist and politician
 Gustav von Schmoller (1838–1917), German economist
 Gustav von Schönberg (1839–1908), German economist
 Max Sering (1857–1939), German economist
 Hans-Werner Sinn (born 1948), German economist
 Werner Sombart (1863–1941), German sociologist and economist
 Arthur Spiethoff (1873–1957), German economist 
 Ferdinand Tönnies (1855–1936), German sociologist and philosopher
 Adolph Wagner (1835–1917), German economist
 Adolf Weber (1876–1963), German economist
 Alfred Weber (1868–1958), German economist and sociologist
 Max Weber (1864–1920), German sociologist and economist

See also
 German Sociological Association
 American Economic Association

References

Sources
 Franz Boese: Geschichte des Vereins für Sozialpolitik, 1872–1932. Duncker & Humblot, Berlin 1939.
 Dieter Lindenlaub: Richtungskämpfe im Verein für Sozialpolitik: Wissenschaft und Socialpolitik im Kaiserreich vornehmlich vom Beginn des 'Neuen Kurses' bis zum Ausbruch des 1. Weltkrieges (1890–1914). Franz Steiner Verlag, Stuttgart 1967.

External links
Official Homepage of the Verein für Socialpolitik

Organizations established in 1873
Economics societies